Four Hours Before His Death (Spanish: Cuatro horas antes de morir) is a 1953 Mexican drama film directed by Emilio Gómez Muriel and starring Carlos Navarro and Carmen Montejo.

Cast
 José Baviera 
 Lupe Carriles 
 Mimí Derba 
 Enrique Díaz 'Indiano' 
 Rafael Estrada 
 Pedro Galván 
 Yadira Jiménez 
 María Cristina Lesser 
 José María Linares-Rivas 
 Héctor Mateos 
 Francisco Meneses 
 Carmen Montejo as Marga  
 Felipe Montoya 
 José Luis Moreno 
 Luis Mussot 
 Carlos Navarro 
 Tito Novaro 
 Andrea Palma 
 Luis Salazar 
 Armando Velasco 
 Julio Villarreal 
 Enrique Zambrano

References

Bibliography 
 María Luisa Amador. Cartelera cinematográfica, 1950-1959. UNAM, 1985.

External links 
 

1953 films
1953 drama films
Mexican drama films
1950s Spanish-language films
Films directed by Emilio Gómez Muriel
Mexican black-and-white films
1950s Mexican films